Vilhelm Herman Oluf Madsen (11 April 1844 – 14 June 1917) was a Danish politician, minister, army officer, businessman and inventor. He was War Minister in the Deuntzer Cabinet 1901–1905.

Career
He began his military career in 1859 and served in the Second War of Schleswig of 1864 as a lieutenant. In 1896, at the rank of colonel, Madsen was responsible for the adoption of the Madsen machine gun by the Danish army in 1902 and widely exported. He also constructed the Madsen 20 mm anti-aircraft cannon.

As Minister of War in the Cabinet of J. H. Deuntzer from 1901 to 1905 he supported the Fortification of Copenhagen and this contributed to the conflict that led to the split of the Venstre Reform Party as the left wing of the party left the party in protest to form the Radikale Venstre. He became a general in 1903 and was elected to the Folketing in 1909.

Personal life
Madsen was the father of the physician Thorvald Madsen. He was interested in mathematics and was the president of Danish Mathematical Society from 1903 to 1910.

References

Sources 
 Bjørn A. Nielsen, Den danske hærs rekylgeværer : system V.H.O. Madsen og J.A.N. Rasmussen, Statens Forsvarshistoriske Museum, 2008. (Forsvarshistoriske skrifter, nr. 6).
 Article "Madsen, Vilhelm Herman Oluf", pp. 23–26, in: Dansk Biografisk Lexikon, 1. ed, vol. XI, 1897

1844 births
1917 deaths
Danish Defence Ministers
Danish generals
Danish mathematicians
Members of the Folketing
19th-century Danish inventors
Firearm designers
Burials at the Garrison Cemetery, Copenhagen